USS R-7 (SS-84) was an R-class coastal and harbor defense submarine of the United States Navy.

Construction and commissioning
R-7′s keel was laid down on 6 December 1917 by the Fore River Shipbuilding Company in Quincy, Massachusetts. She was launched on 5 April 1919, sponsored by Mrs. Ivan E. Bass, and commissioned on 12 June 1919.

Service history

1919–1931
Completed and fitted out at Boston, Massachusetts, during the summer and early fall of 1919, R-7 got underway for New London, Connecticut, and duty with SubDiv 9 on 21 October. Through November she conducted training exercises off the Connecticut coast. In December she headed south for Norfolk, Virginia, and winter exercises in the Gulf of Mexico. Into April 1920, she operated out of Pensacola, Florida, before returning to New England in May. Given hull classification symbol SS-84 in July 1920, she again headed south on 13 September this time for overhaul at the Norfolk Navy Yard until April 1921. Then, reassigned to the Pacific Fleet, she continued south and transited the Panama Canal.

Arriving at San Pedro, California, her new homeport, on 30 June, she engaged in individual, divisional, and fleet exercises off the coasts of California and Mexico for the next two years. On 11 July 1923 she departed California and 11 days later arrived at Pearl Harbor, her base for the next eight years. The submarine's operations included fleet problems and regular patrols which, with increased air traffic from 1925 on, occasionally involved air-sea rescue operations.

Toward the end of 1930, R-7 was ordered back to the East Coast for inactivation. Underway on 12 December, she arrived at Philadelphia, Pennsylvania, on 9 February 1931 and decommissioned on 2 May.

1940–1946
She remained in the Reserve Fleet until recommissioned in ordinary 22 July 1940. Then, shifted to New London, she completed activation and recommissioned in full on 14 March 1941. Ready for sea in early April, she moved south in May and conducted patrols in the Virgin Islands and off Panama into the fall. On 8 October she returned to New London, underwent overhaul, and at the end of November began a series of anti-submarine patrols in the shipping lanes between Bermuda and the northeastern coast. She maintained those patrols through the German anti-shipping offensive of 1942 alternately basing her operations at Bermuda and New London. Once, in May 1942, she sighted a U-boat and launched four torpedoes, but lost contact while reloading.

From the spring of 1943 until the end of World War II, the R-boat shifted the emphasis of her anti-submarine warfare mission and concentrated on training destroyers and destroyer escorts in ASW tactics. She arrived at Portsmouth, New Hampshire, on 6 September 1945, decommissioned on 14 September, and was struck from the Naval Vessel Register on 11 October 1945. In September 1946 she was sold for scrap to John J. Duane of Quincy, Massachusetts.

References

External links
 

United States R-class submarines
World War II submarines of the United States
Ships built in Quincy, Massachusetts
1919 ships